Henry Petty, 1st Earl of Shelburne PC (I) (22 October 1675 – 17 April 1751) was an Anglo-Irish peer and politician who sat in the House of Commons from 1715 to 1727.

Background
Petty was a younger son of Sir William Petty and Elizabeth, Baroness Shelburne, daughter of Sir Hardress Waller. He succeeded his elder brother Charles Petty, 1st Baron Shelburne to the family estates in 1696 and then bought further estates near Wycombe, Buckinghamshire.

Political career
Petty was elected to the Irish House of Commons for Midleton in 1692, a seat he held until 1693, and then represented County Waterford between 1695 and 1699. The latter year the barony of Shelburne which had become extinct on the early death of his elder brother in 1696 was revived in his favour. Two years later he was sworn of the Irish Privy Council. He was later a member of the British House of Commons for Great Marlow between 1715 and 1722 and for Wycombe between 1722 and 1727.  In 1719 he was further honoured when he was made Viscount Dunkerron and Earl of Shelburne in the Peerage of Ireland.

Personal life
Lord Shelburne married the Hon. Arabella, daughter of Charles Boyle, 3rd Viscount Dungarvan, in 1699. They had one daughter Anne who married Francis Bernard of Castle Bernard, Bandon, County Cork. The Countess of Shelburne died in October 1740. Lord Shelburne survived her by eleven years and died in April 1751, aged 75, when his titles became extinct. His estates devolved on his nephew John FitzMaurice, who changed his surname to Petty and in whose favour the earldom of Shelburne was revived in 1753 (see Marquess of Lansdowne).

References
 

1675 births
1751 deaths
British MPs 1715–1722
British MPs 1722–1727
Peers of Ireland created by William III
Petty, Henry
Petty, Henry
Members of the Privy Council of Ireland
Younger sons of barons
Henry
Fellows of the Royal Society
Members of the Parliament of Great Britain for English constituencies
Members of the Parliament of Ireland (pre-1801) for County Cork constituencies
Members of the Parliament of Ireland (pre-1801) for County Waterford constituencies
1